The lordship of Piedmont, later the principality of Piedmont, was originally an appanage of the County of Savoy, and as such its lords were members of the Achaea branch of the House of Savoy. The title was inherited by the elder branch of the dynasty in 1418, at about which time Savoy was elevated to ducal status and Piedmont to princely status. When the House of Savoy was given the Kingdom of Sardinia, the Savoyards used the style of Prince of Piedmont for their heir apparent. This first came into use by Prince Victor Amadeus of Savoy.

The usage was retained when Victor Emmanuel II became King of Italy, "Prince of Piedmont" becoming roughly equivalent to the British "Prince of Wales", the title bestowed to the Crown prince.

Lords of Piedmont
????–1233 Thomas I, also Count of Savoy
1233–1259 Thomas II, son of previous
1259–1282 Thomas III, son of previous
1282–1334 Philip I, son of previous, also Prince of Achaea (1301–1307)
1334–1367 James, son of previous, claimant to Achaea
1368–1368 Philip II, son of previous
1368–1402 Amadeus, brother of previous, claimant to Achaea
1402–1418 Louis, brother of previous

Princes of Piedmont
Note: The names in bold denote those that succeeded to the throne.

Princes of Piedmont and Naples
When the House of Savoy became the ruling dynasty of Italy in 1861, they continued to use the title of Prince of Piedmont for the heir apparent but also began alternating it with a new title, the Prince of Naples.

Insignia

Piedmont, Lord of
Piedmont, Lord of
Counts of Piedmont
Princes of Piedmont
Piedmont
House of Savoy